Radošovice is a municipality and village in České Budějovice District in the South Bohemian Region of the Czech Republic. It has about 200 inhabitants.

Administrative parts
The village of Tupesy is an administrative part of Radošovice.

References

Villages in České Budějovice District